Garra lautior is a species of ray-finned fish in the genus Garra, endemic to the Wadi Hadramut drainage in Yemen.

References 

Garra
Fish described in 1987